Marguerite Abouet (born 1971) is an Ivorian writer of bandes dessinées, best known for her graphic novel series Aya.

Biography
Abouet was born in 1971 in Abidjan, Côte d'Ivoire, and at the age of 12 she and her brother moved to France with their great uncle. She currently lives in Romainville, a suburb of Paris, with her husband, illustrator Clément Oubrerie (who illustrates her graphic concepts), and their young son.  She worked as a legal assistant in Paris while writing her first graphic novel, Aya.  Abouet had tried to write novels for young people, but she gave up in frustration with what she perceived to be the constraints put on the genre by the publishers.  She left her job as a legal assistant to concentrate on writing full-time, including her two follow-up graphic novels to Aya (Aya of Yop City and Aya:  The Secrets Come Out).

Aya

Aya is Abouet's first published work.  It is also her first venture into graphic novels, as well as a collaborative effort with her husband, for whom Aya was his first illustrating job in graphic novels.  She was influenced to do a graphic novel by Marjane Satrapi, the author of Persepolis.  It also emerged from her desire to show an Africa with a focus on issues other than war and famine, which is typically what the media focus on in portraying Africa.  Her characters attend school, trudge to work, plan for the future and are ensnared in domestic entanglements on the Ivory Coast in the same way as happens everywhere else. The story has been adapted into an animated film co-directed by Abouet.

Abouet denies that Aya is autobiographical, except in the sense that it depicts the Ivory Coast that she is familiar with.  The characters are based on people she knew growing up, but the situations are purely fictional.

Aya has been considered a success especially for a first-time author.  It won the 2006 Angoulême International Comics Festival Prize for First Comic Book and has sold over 200,000 copies in France.  The Canadian publisher Drawn & Quarterly distributed the English-language version in the United States.  They printed more than 10,000 copies, a significant number for a first-time graphic novel in the U.S. Abouet persuaded her French publisher to sell cheaper, soft-cover copies of the graphic novel in her native Ivory Coast.

References

References

Marguerite Abouet at Bedetheque

External links

 "Marguerite Abouet", Cultures with Vivendi, 13 January 2017.

Ivorian women novelists
Female comics writers
1971 births
Living people
Ivorian women writers
21st-century women writers
People from Abidjan
Ivorian emigrants to France